The 2008 AFC Champions League was the 27th AFC Champions League, the top-level Asian club football tournament, and the 6th under the current AFC Champions League title. It was the last AFC Champions League before the competition expanded to 32 teams.

Participating clubs
Along with the defending champion, Urawa Red Diamonds, 28 other clubs from fourteen countries qualified based on performance in domestic league and cup competitions. Urawa Red Diamonds entered the competition at the quarter-finals. The draw for group stage took place on 12 December 2007.

† In the 2008 edition, Indonesia were allocated two slots just like the older editions. However, on 12 December 2007, AFC awarded one Indonesian slots to Thailand and the other one to Vietnam, due to delay in Indonesian domestic league and cup tournament, allowing both Thai and Vietnamese slots to be total of two.

Format
Group stage
A total of 28 clubs were divided into seven groups of four, based on region, i.e. East Asian and Southeast Asian clubs were drawn in groups E to G, while the rest were grouped in groups A to D. Each club played double round-robin (home and away) against the other three teams in their group, a total of 6 matches each. Clubs received three points for a win, one point for a draw and no points for a loss. The clubs were ranked according to points and tie breakers were in the following order:
 Points earned between the clubs in question
 Goal difference between the clubs in question
 Goal difference within the group
 Goals for within the group

The seven group winners and the defending champion advanced to the quarter-finals.

Knockout stage
All eight clubs were randomly paired together, with the restriction that clubs from the same country could not face each other in the quarter-finals. The games were played over two legs, home and away; the team with the higher aggregate score was declared the match winner. If the aggregate score could not produce a winner, "away goals rule" was used. If the two teams were still tied, extra time was played, at the end of which the "away goals rule" was again applied if the scores were tied. If still tied, the game would go to penalties.

Schedule
Group stage draw - 12 December 2007
Group round: 12–19 March, 9–23 April, 7–21 May

Knockout stage draw - 24 May 2008
Quarter-finals: 17–24 September
Semi-finals: 8–22 October
Final: 5 and 12 November

Group stage

Group A

Group B

Group C

Group D

Group E

Group F

Notes
Note 2: Nam Định played their home matches at Mỹ Đình National Stadium, Hanoi as their own Thiên Trường Stadium did not meet AFC criteria.

Group G

Notes
Note 3: Chonburi played their home matches at Supachalasai Stadium, Bangkok as their own Chonburi Municipality Stadium did not meet AFC criteria.

Knock-out stage

Bracket

Quarter-finals
The first leg matches were played on 17 September, and the second leg matches were played on 24 September 2008.

Semi-finals
The first leg matches were played on 8 October, and the second leg matches were played on 22 October 2008.

Final

The first and second legs of the final were played on 5 and 12 November 2008, respectively.

Top scorers
The top scorers from the 2008 AFC Champions League are as follows:

Fair Play Award

 Gamba Osaka

See also
2008 FIFA Club World Cup

References

External links
AFC Champions League Official Page (English)
AFC Champions League on goalzz.com
AFC Calendar of Events 2008

 
2008
1